Rozalin may refer to several places:

Places
Rozalin, Lublin Voivodeship (east Poland)
Rozalin, Pruszków County in Masovian Voivodeship (east-central Poland)
Rozalin, Subcarpathian Voivodeship (south-east Poland)
Rozalin, Wołomin County in Masovian Voivodeship (east-central Poland)
Rozalin, Konin County in Greater Poland Voivodeship (west-central Poland)
Rozalin, Słupca County in Greater Poland Voivodeship (west-central Poland)
Rozalin, Silesian Voivodeship (south Poland)

Other uses
the fictional Disgaea character
Liqueur rozalin, see rožata